David Behre (born 13 September 1986 in Duisburg) is a German Paralympic sprint runner in the T43 class. He is a double leg amputee who lost both feet in September 2007 when his bicycle was hit by a train. While recovering in the hospital, he saw a documentary on runner Oscar Pistorius and decided to become a sprint runner.

Behre holds the German record in the 100 meters event with a time of 11.66 seconds, the European records in the 200 meters event with a time of 23.14s and the 400 meters event with a time of 51.40s. At the 2012 Paralympic Games, Behre won a bronze medal as part of the German 4 × 100 m relay team.

See also
The Mechanics of Running Blades

References

External links
 
 

1986 births
Living people
German male sprinters
German amputees
Sprinters with limb difference
Paralympic sprinters
Paralympic athletes of Germany
Paralympic bronze medalists for Germany
Paralympic gold medalists for Germany
Paralympic medalists in athletics (track and field)
Athletes (track and field) at the 2012 Summer Paralympics
Athletes (track and field) at the 2016 Summer Paralympics
Athletes (track and field) at the 2020 Summer Paralympics
Medalists at the 2012 Summer Paralympics
Medalists at the 2016 Summer Paralympics
World Para Athletics Championships winners
Medalists at the World Para Athletics European Championships
Sportspeople from Duisburg
21st-century German people